Giuseppe Verdi's Rigoletto Story (2005) is a film version of Giuseppe Verdi's 1851 opera Rigoletto (libretto by Francesco Maria Piave). Filmed in Siena in 2002, it was directed by Gianfranco Fozzi and produced by David Guido Pietroni and Maurizio De Santis distributed worldwide by Columbia TriStar Home Entertainment and Sony Pictures Home Entertainment.

Cast
Rigoletto, the Duke's jester (baritone) – Roberto Servile
Gilda, his daughter (soprano) – Inva Mula
Duke of Mantua (tenor) – Marcelo Álvarez
Sparafucile, an assassin (bass) – Andrea Silvestrelli
Maddalena, his sister (mezzo-soprano) – Svetlana Serdar
Giovanna, Gilda's Nurse (mezzo-soprano) – Paola Leveroni
Count Ceprano (bass) – Boschetti Giulio
Countess Ceprano, his wife (mezzo-soprano) – Emilia Bertoncello
Matteo Borsa, a courtier (tenor) – Giovanni Maini
Count Monterone (baritone) – Cesare Lana
Marullo (baritone) Andrea Cortese

Film details
Film Company: Roadhouse Movie
 Label: Columbia TriStar Home Entertainment, Sony Pictures Home Entertainment
 Producers: David Guido Pietroni and Maurizio De Santis
Stage director: Vittorio Sgarbi
Film director: Gianfranco Fozzi
Post Production: Christian Verzino
Costume Designer: Vivienne Westwood
Conductor: Keri-Lynn Wilson
Orchestra: Arturo Toscanini Foundation
Runtime: USA: 126 minutes
Country: Italy
Language: Italian
Sound Mix: Celeste Frigo, Mauro Casazza
Certification: Australia:G / UK:U
Bonus: Exclusive comic book inside "Rigoletto comix" by Enrico Simonato

External links

2002 films
2000s musical films
Italian musical films
Films based on works by Victor Hugo
Films based on operas by Giuseppe Verdi
Films set in the 16th century
Opera films
2000s Italian films